Melanie Chandra (née Kannokada; born February 28, 1986) is an American actress, model, and co-founder of Hospital for Hope. She is best known for her roles as Malaya Pineda on the CBS medical drama Code Black and Mel in the Comedy Central television movie Hot Mess Holiday.

Early life and education 
Chandra was born Melanie Kannokada to Malayali Indian parents in Buffalo Grove, Illinois.

After high school, Chandra earned a Mechanical Engineering degree from Stanford University. Upon graduation, Chandra initially began working at consulting firm McKinsey & Company, which she left to concentrate on her interest in modeling and acting. She stated that she found the management job "intellectually fascinating" but not something she wanted to do "getting up every morning".

Career 
After finishing college, Chandra entered and won the 2007 Miss India America contest. Chandra worked as a model and commercial actress in national and international campaigns for Nescafe, Verizon, Glamour Magazine, P&G, Crocs, Acura, Herbal Essences, LG, and Clinique. In fall 2011, she was selected as one of the five faces of Bare Escentuals international "Be A Force of Beauty" campaign. In fall 2012, she was selected to model in a five-page editorial spread for Vogue India Magazine.

Within a week of moving to Los Angeles to pursue an acting career, Chandra successfully auditioned for guest star role in the CBS hit sitcom Rules of Engagement opposite comedian David Spade. She starred in the CBS show Code Black and has guest starred in ABC Family's The Nine Lives of Chloe King, NBC's Parenthood and CBS's NCIS: Los Angeles. She also had a large recurring role on HBO's The Brink opposite Jack Black and Aasif Mandvi. In 2019, it was announced she will be developing a series called "Attachment" with HBO, alongside her co-creator and writer, Amy Aniobi, and Reese Witherspoon's Hello Sunshine. In 2019, Chandra stars in Surina and Mel, a show about two American-born South Asian women living in New York City figuring out adulthood. In 2020, Variety announced Chandra was joining the cast of the Chris Blake quarantine comedy, Distancing Socially. The film was shot at the height of the Covid-19 pandemic in 2020, using remote technologies and the iPhone 11. The film was acquired and released by Cinedigm in October 2021.

In 2022, Chandra starred in the movie Lie Hard, a comedy about a pathological liar who borrows $4 million from a crime syndicate to purchase a mansion in order to impress his girlfriend's wealthy parents.

In January 2023, Chandra voice acted as Mira in Meet Cute's series, The Lonely Wife. The story follows Mira, who is forced to take a hard look at her marriage when her husband’s childhood friend crashes with them for the weekend.

Personal 
Chandra is also a co-founder of Hospital for Hope, a non-profit providing healthcare services in rural India. She is also a trained pianist. Chandra is a 2nd degree black belt in Shotokan Karate and a two-time bronze medalist in the Pan American games, where she represented the United States in sparring as part of the United States Junior National Karate Team in São Paulo in 2000, Caracas in 2001, and Orlando in 2002.

Filmography

Television

Film

References

External links 
 Official Website
 
 Times of India article
 Economic Times article

Living people
Actors from Park Ridge, Illinois
Actresses from Illinois
American people of Indian descent
American businesspeople
American film actresses
American actresses of Indian descent
American people of Malayali descent
Female models from Illinois
Stanford University alumni
21st-century American actresses
1984 births